Trimeresurus sabahi, commonly known as the Sabah pit viper or Sabah bamboo pitviper, is a venomous pitviper species. If defined narrowly, it is endemic to the island of Borneo. If defined more broadly, it consists of five subspecies found in Southeast Asia.

Subspecies
There are five subspecies:
 Trimeresurus sabahi barati Regenass & Kramer, 1981 – Sumatra, Mentawai Archipelago (Indonesia)
 Trimeresurus sabahi buniana , Grismer & McGuire, 2006 – Tioman Island (Malaysia)
 Trimeresurus sabahi fucatus Vogel, David & , 2004 – Malay Peninsula (southern Myanmar, Thailand, West Malaysia)
 Trimeresurus sabahi sabahi Regenass & Kramer, 1981 – northern Borneo (Malaysia)
 Trimeresurus sabahi toba David, Petri, Vogel & Doria, 2009 – Sumatra

IUCN treats these as full species, respectively Trimeresurus barati, Trimeresurus buniana, Trimeresurus fucatus, and Trimeresurus toba, restricting Trimeresurus sabahi to the nominotypical subspecies.

Description

Dorsally, it is uniform green, without crossbars. Ventrally it is pale green. There is narrow bicolor stripe on the first one and a half dorsal scale rows. In males this stripe is rust-colored or red below, and it is white above. In females it is yellow or white. The iris of the eye is red or orange in adults of both sexes, but in young specimens may be yellowish-green. There are no markings behind the eye.

The scalation includes 21 (23) rows of dorsal scales at midbody, 149–157/148–156 ventral scales in males/females or 148–159 in general, 72–76/59–65 subcaudal scales in males/females, and 9–11 supralabial scales (9–10 with the third being the largest).

Habitat

Reproduction
The reproductive biology of this species is unknown.

References

Further reading
 Regenass, Urs; Kramer, Eugen. 1981. Zur Systematik der grünen Grubenottern der Gattung Trimeresurus (Serpentes, Crotalidae). Rev. Suisse de Zoolo. 88 (1): 163–205.

sabahi
Snakes of Southeast Asia
Reptiles of Indonesia
Reptiles of Malaysia
Reptiles of Myanmar
Reptiles of Thailand
Reptiles described in 1981
Reptiles of Borneo